Powerdrome is a 1988 futuristic racing video game by Michael Powell released on the Atari ST and published by Electronic Arts. Players race jet-engined, anti-gravity bikes called blades around closed tracks. Ports for Amiga and MS-DOS were released in 1989 and 1990 respectively. A remake was released in 2004.

Gameplay
The game includes six tracks, set across five planets. The road-equivalent turning method of yaw is not present, meaning a right turn is achieved by rolling to the right and pitching up. Control is very sensitive but allows use of the mouse for greater accuracy. Gameplay is complicated by the need to equip gas filters to cope with each planet's atmosphere and weather, with further choices to be made over types of fuel.

Control was improved for the Amiga release in 1989 and an extra track made available. A version on the PC in 1990 was soon followed by a re-release on all formats.

Reception 
Released as a budget game, Powerdrome received good reviews, with a few remembering the original and its influence on the futuristic racing genre. All were impressed with the smooth sensation of speed and detailed environments, although the music was considered lackluster and the pilots' voices annoying.

Remake

A remake known as Powerdrome (or Power Drome) was released for the PlayStation 2 and Xbox in June 2004. A Microsoft Windows version was released in August 2005 only in Europe. It was developed by Argonaut Sheffield, for whom Powell was studio head. Mud Duck Productions published the game in North America, Evolved Games in Europe and the PC version was published by Zoo Digital Publishing. Venues for racing still only number six, but reverse and mirrored courses bring the total of unique routes to 24. The previous version's customisation was completely dropped in favour of a focus on racing skill.

References

External links

1988 video games
2004 video games
Amiga games
Argonaut Games games
Atari ST games
DOS games
Electronic Arts games
Science fiction racing games
PlayStation 2 games
Racing video games
Video games developed in the United Kingdom
Video games scored by Christopher Mann
Windows games
Xbox games
Multiplayer and single-player video games